The 2011 Ashfield District Council election took place on 5 May 2011 to elect members of Ashfield District Council in Nottinghamshire, England. The whole council was up for election and the Labour party gained overall control of the council from no overall control.

Background
Before the 2011 election the Liberal Democrats formed the largest group on the council and following the 2007 election had led the council. However the Labour, independent and Conservative councillors joined together to oust the Liberal Democrats, Labour's John Knight then became the leader of the council. This lasted until the 2013 County Elections when due to a conflict with also being a Councillor at county level he stood down as leader. Since then the leader of Ashfield District Council has been Chris Baron.

Before the election the Liberal Democrats had 13 councillors, compared to 10 independents, 9 Labour and 1 Conservative. Both the Labour and Liberal Democrat parties put up 33 candidates in the election, compared to 13 Conservatives, with 9 of the 13 Conservative candidates being in Hucknall, which was seen as the Conservatives best area.  There were 9 seats to be contested over 4 wards in Hucknall all of which Labour returned all 9.

Three days before the election the national Labour leader Ed Miliband visited Kirkby in Ashfield to campaign in the local elections.  He also visited Hucknall during his Labour leadership campaign in 2010.

Election result
The results had Labour gain 15 seats to win a majority on the council with 24 of the 33 seats. Both the independents and Liberal Democrats lost 7 seats, to fall to 3 and 6 seats respectively. Meanwhile, the only Conservative councillor, John Dymock, lost his seat in Hucknall North. Overall turnout in the election was slightly under 39%.

|}

Ward results

Hucknall Central

Hucknall East

Hucknall North

Hucknall West

Jacksdale

Kirkby-in-Ashfield Central

Kirkby-in-Ashfield East

Kirkby-in-Ashfield West

Selston

Sutton-In-Ashfield Central

Sutton-In-Ashfield East

Sutton-In-Ashfield North

Sutton-In-Ashfield West

Underwood

Woodhouse

References

2011 English local elections
2011
2010s in Nottinghamshire